Disputed Passage is a 1939 American drama war film directed by Frank Borzage and starring Dorothy Lamour, Akim Tamiroff, John Howard, Judith Barrett and William Collier, Sr. Set in war-torn China, the film was described by The New York Times as a "lavish soap opera". The film was based on the best-selling novel of the same name by Lloyd C. Douglas, and was produced by Paramount Pictures.

Plot
Young medical student John Wesley Beaven (John Howard) is torn between the detached, cold pragmatism of Dr. Forster (Akim Tamiroff) and the humanistic attitudes of kindly Dr. Cunningham (William Collier Sr.). Matters are brought to a head when Beaven must choose between his career and impending marriage to fellow student Audrey Hilton (Dorothy Lamour). Dr. Forster convinces Audrey to return to her native China and let Beaven pursue his studies undistracted. She takes Forster's advice, but Beaven follows her. Once in the Orient he is injured in a bomb blast, and in a makeshift hospital, Dr. Forster is called on to perform a risky operation to save his life.

Cast
 Dorothy Lamour as Audrey Hilton
 Akim Tamiroff as Dr 'Tubby' Forster
 John Howard as John Wesley Beaven
 Judith Barrett as Winifred Bane
 William Collier, Sr. as Dr. William Cunningham
 Victor Varconi as Dr. LaFerriere
 Gordon Jones as Bill Anderson
 Keye Luke as Andrew Abbott
 Elisabeth Risdon as Mrs Cunningham
 Steve Pendleton as Lawrence Carpenter (as Gaylord Pendleton)
 Billy Cook as Johnny Merkle
 William Pawley as Mr Merkle
 Renie Riano as Mrs Riley
 Z.T. Nyi as Chinese Ambassador
 Philson Ahn as Kai
 E.Y. Chung as Dr Ling (as Dr. E.Y. Chung)
 Philip Ahn as Dr. Fung
 Dandan Li as Aviatrix (as Lee Ya-Ching)

Critical reception
The New York Times concluded,"if you have gathered from the foregoing that Disputed Passage smacks of synthetic drama and not too subtle moralizing, you have gleaned aright. What you might not have gathered is that the film, particularly in its early phases, has been forcefully written and rather well played. While there no longer is much news in the conflict between the sympathetic, sentimental physician and the cold scientist who caustically challenges his medical class to find a human soul in their dissections, the topic remains a fertile and provocative one." and Allmovie wrote, "kudos again to director Frank Borzage for bringing warmth and credibility to the most sloppily sentimental of storylines."

References

External links
 
 
 

1939 films
American black-and-white films
Paramount Pictures films
Films directed by Frank Borzage
Films scored by Friedrich Hollaender
Films set in China
Second Sino-Japanese War films
American war drama films
1939 war films
1939 drama films
1930s English-language films
1930s American films